Karthigai Pengal is an Indian Tamil-language soap opera that aired on Sun TV from 30 July 2012 to 23 August 2013 aired Monday through Friday at 10:00PM IST for 266 episodes. The story of a woman who faces many problems in life. But she faces them with a smile, works with others and makes sure that everyone around her is happy.

The show  starred Shruti, Dr. Sharmila, Bhanu Chander, Nalini, Divya Kumar, Anandhi and Ramesh among others It was produced by Thiru Pictures Thirumurugan also Creative head and directed by Kavitha Bharathy. It was also aired in Sri Lanka Tamil Channel on Shakthi TV.

Plot
This serial showed the story of girls in a hostel, with Charu (Shruti) as the main character. It made a deep impact and gave new confidence to women who are staying alone for different life reasons. It told them they can face their challenges with support from other good people. Charu (Shruti) and other hostel girls' (Divya, Anandhi) life as depicted in this serial worked a proof for this. For this reason.

Cast
 Shruti as Charu 
 Dr. Sharmila
 Bhanu Chander
 Nalini
 Divya Kumar
 Anandhi
 Ramesh
 Sri vidhya
 Shwetha Subramanian
 Kartic Krishna
 Vijay
 Deepa Shankar

See also
 List of programs broadcast by Sun TV
 List of TV shows aired on Sun TV (India)

References

External links
 Official Website 
 Sun TV on YouTube
 Sun TV Network 
 Sun Group 

Sun TV original programming
2012 Tamil-language television series debuts
Tamil-language television shows
2013 Tamil-language television series endings